Hiawatha, the Messiah of the Ojibway is a 1903 dramatic short film shot in Canada directed by the American pioneering cinematographer and director Joe Rosenthal, based on the Henry Wadsworth Longfellow's famous poem, The Song of Hiawatha, made in Desbarats, Ontario, with a cast of Ojibway First Nations people. According to the Canadian Journal of Film Studies, it was the first dramatic narrative film to be shot in Canada.

At 15 minutes, Hiawatha was considerably longer than the usual productions of 1903, which rarely exceeded three minutes. The film's subtitle was The Passion Play of America and was largely a photographed stage play with Longfellow's words spoken in a natural surrounding.

It is considered a lost film.

References

1900s lost films
1903 films
1903 short films
First Nations films
Films shot in Ontario
Films based on works by Henry Wadsworth Longfellow
Lost drama films
Ojibwe culture
Canadian silent short films
1903 drama films
Works based on The Song of Hiawatha
Canadian drama short films
Silent drama films